Eriocybe is a fungal genus in the family Agaricaceae. Circumscribed by mycologist Else Vellinga in 2011, it is a monotypic genus, containing the single species Eriocybe chionea, found in northern Thailand. The genus name is derived from the Ancient Greek words ἔριον, meaning "wool" and κύβη, "head". The specific epithet comes from the Latin translation of the Greek χιόνεος, meaning "snow white".

See also
 List of Agaricaceae genera
 List of Agaricales genera

References

Agaricaceae
Fungi of Asia
Monotypic Agaricales genera